Minergie is a registered quality label for new and refurbished low-energy-consumption buildings. This label is mutually supported by the Swiss Confederation, the Swiss Cantons and the Principality of Liechtenstein along with Trade and Industry. The label is registered in Switzerland and around the world and is thus protected against unlicensed use. The Minergie label may only be used for buildings, services and components that actually meet the Minergie standard.

Building to Minergie standards means providing high-grade, air-tight building envelopes and the continuous renewal of air in the building using an energy-efficient ventilation system. Specific energy consumption is used as the main indicator to quantify the required building quality. In this way, a reliable assessment can be assured. Only the final energy consumed is relevant.

At present around 13% of new buildings and 2% of refurbishment projects are Minergie certified. These are mostly residential buildings. The goals of the Swiss national SwissEnergy#Infrastructure and environment programme call for 20% of new construction and 5-10% of refurbishment projects to be Minergie certified.

The Minergie standard is somewhat comparable to German KfW40 (new buildings) and KfW60 (refurbishment) standards.

History 

The Minergie idea was developed in 1994 by Heinz Uebersax and Ruedi Kriesi, and the first two Minergie houses were realized in that same year. Minergie was registered as a trademark to prevent misuse. In 1997 it was acquired by the Swiss Cantons Zurich and Berne. In 1998 the present Minergie Association was founded, and its first standard, the Minergie label for low-energy-consumption buildings, was published. At the end of 2001, a further, more stringent standard for so-called passive housing was introduced, Minergie-P. Since then, further applications of the label have been defined, such as those for specific building components.

Certification 

Certification is done on the basis of planning values and thus offers no guarantee that these values are actually met. Research by the University of Applied Sciences, Business and Social Work in St. Gallen, Switzerland, has proven that refurbishment projects and single-family homes are better than the standard. Larger residential buildings sometimes do not quite meet the standards.

Mainly, Minergie recommends the construction of compact, well-insulated and air-tight buildings in order to attain good energy consumption standards. The buildings must be fitted with an automatic air-renewal system with heat recovery. A fee is charged for certification. (These are: 900 Swiss Francs for houses that are less than 500m2; 1100 Francs for equivalently-sized commercial projects; and 1600, 3500 and 10,000 for projects between 500 and 2000 metres squared, 2000 and 5000, and over 5000 metres squared, respectively.)

System audit and verification 

For all categories of building except newly built single-family homes the expected energy consumption per surface area must be declared and verified. For new single-family homes and apartment blocks 38 kWh/m2/annum must not be exceeded. For refurbishment projects the limiting value is 60 kWh/m2/annum. For reasons of simplicity, energy consumption for hot water preparation is included in these figures. For buildings at altitudes above 800 m, the limit values are increased. New buildings must also leak less than or equal to 0.9 air changes per hour at 50 pascal.
Depending on the building's category, various additional requirements are made: For single-family homes and apartment blocks, restaurants and indoor pools a ventilation system with heat recovery is compulsory. In this way, it can be guaranteed that Minergie buildings are not only energy-saving, but also are considered comfortable by their residents. For offices, schools and sales premises, an energy-efficient lighting concept according to the Swiss SIA 380/4 standard is prescribed.

Standard solutions 
Five simplified standard solutions are available for single-family homes. These are:

 Heating and hot water preparation over the whole year using heat pump with a ground-probe as energy source
 Wood-fired heating and hot-water preparation using solar collectors
 Automatic pellet-fired heating and hot-water preparation
 Use of district heating with waste heat 
 Air-water heat-pump-based heating and hot water preparation.

In addition, a high level of insulation is recommended. A ventilation system with heat-recovery is also called for.

See also 
 Effinergie in France
 Passivhaus in Germany

References

External links 
 Minergie International Website 
 Minergie Congressional Briefing Addressing Climate Change with Energy Efficient Buildings: Best Practices from Switzerland

Sustainable building rating systems